The Gateway Athletic Conference is a Missouri State High School Activities Association recognized high school extracurricular league which includes sixteen schools located in the suburbs of St. Louis. The conference is divided into three divisions based on enrollment. The North division includes schools with smaller enrollment, the Central division for medium enrollment schools, and the South division for larger enrollment schools. Schools in the conference are located in St. Charles, Lincoln, Warren and Franklin counties in Missouri

List of member schools

North

Central

South

*The class in which a school competes depends on the size of the school, and the particular sport or activity.  Most activities (for example, baseball, softball, track, cross country) compete in four classes, but basketball competes in five and football in six.

References

External links
 Official website

High school sports conferences and leagues in the United States
Missouri high school athletic conferences